The 2002 Individual Speedway European Championship

Qualification
Semi-Final A:
August 11, 2002
 Lendava
Semi-Final B:
May 18, 2002
 Terenzano
Scandinavian Final (Semi-Final C):
June 7, 2002
 Hagfors

Final
September 7, 2002
 Rybnik

See also

2002
Euro I